

Events

Works published
Þiðrekssaga (approx.)

Births

Deaths
 Kambar (born 1180), medieval Tamil poet and the author of the Ramavataram
 Julian of Speyer (born unknown), German Franciscan composer, poet, and historian; Latin (approx.)

13th-century poetry
Poetry